The Second Continental Congress was a late-18th-century meeting of delegates from the Thirteen Colonies that united in support of the American Revolutionary War. The Congress created a new country it first named the United Colonies and, in 1776, renamed the United States of America. It convened in Philadelphia, then the federal capital, on May 10, 1775, with representatives from 12 of the 13 colonies. This came shortly after the Battles of Lexington and Concord and was in succession to the First Continental Congress which met from September 5 to October 26, 1774. The Second Congress functioned as a de facto national government at the outset of the Revolutionary War by raising armies, directing strategy, appointing diplomats, and writing petitions such as the Declaration of the Causes and Necessity of Taking Up Arms and the Olive Branch Petition.  All thirteen colonies were represented by the time the Congress adopted the Lee Resolution which declared independence from Britain on July 2, 1776, and the congress agreed to the Declaration of Independence two days later. 

Afterward, Congress functioned as the provisional government of the United States of America through March 1, 1781. During this period, its achievements included: Successfully managing the war effort; drafting the Articles of Confederation and Perpetual Union, the first U.S. constitution; securing diplomatic recognition and support from foreign nations, and resolving state land claims west of the Appalachian Mountains.

Many of the delegates who attended the Second Congress had also attended the First. They again elected Peyton Randolph as President of the Congress and Charles Thomson as secretary. Notable new arrivals included Benjamin Franklin of Pennsylvania and John Hancock of Massachusetts.  Within two weeks, Randolph was summoned back to Virginia to preside over the House of Burgesses; Hancock succeeded him as president, and Thomas Jefferson replaced him in the Virginia delegation. The number of participating colonies also grew, as Georgia endorsed the Congress in July 1775 and adopted the continental ban on trade with Britain.

History

In fact, government
The First Continental Congress had sent entreaties to King George III to stop the Intolerable Acts. They had also created the Continental Association to establish a coordinated protest of those acts, putting a boycott on British goods. The Second Continental Congress met on May 10, 1775, to plan further responses if the British government had not repealed or modified the acts; however, the American Revolutionary War had already started by that time with the Battles of Lexington and Concord, and the Congress was called upon to take charge of the war effort.

For the first few months of the war, the patriots carried on their struggle in an ad-hoc and uncoordinated manner. Even so, they had seized numerous arsenals, driven out royal officials in various colonies, and besieged Boston in order to prevent the movement by land of British troops garrisoned there. On June 14, 1775, Congress voted to create the Continental Army out of the militia units around Boston, and the next day unanimously approved  a motion naming George Washington of Virginia as commanding general. On July 6, 1775, Congress approved a Declaration of Causes outlining the rationale and necessity for taking up arms in the Thirteen Colonies. Two days later delegates signed the Olive Branch Petition to the king affirming the colonies' loyalty to the crown and imploring the king to prevent further conflict. However, by the time British Colonial Secretary Lord Dartmouth received the petition, King George III had already issued a proclamation on August 23, 1775, in response to the news of the Battle of Bunker Hill, declaring elements of Britain's continental American possessions to be in a state of "open and avowed rebellion". As a result, the king refused to receive the petition.

Georgia had not participated in the First Continental Congress and did not initially send delegates to the Second. Even so, the people of St. John's Parish (present-day Liberty County) sent Lyman Hall to the gathering on their behalf. He participated in debates but did not vote, as he did not represent the entire colony. That changed after July 1775, when a provincial Congress decided to send delegates to the Continental Congress and to adopt a ban on trade with Britain.

The Continental Congress had no explicit legal authority to govern, but it assumed all the functions of a national government, such as appointing ambassadors, signing treaties, raising armies, appointing generals, obtaining loans from Europe, issuing paper money (called "Continentals"), and disbursing funds. Congress had no authority to levy taxes and was required to request money, supplies, and troops from the states to support the war effort. Individual states frequently ignored these requests.

Congress was moving towards declaring independence from the British Empire in 1776, but many delegates lacked the authority from their home governments to take such drastic action. Advocates of independence moved to have reluctant colonial governments revise instructions to their delegations, or even replace those governments which would not authorize independence. On May 10, 1776, Congress passed a resolution recommending that any colony with a government that was not inclined toward independence should form one that was. On May 15, they adopted a more radical preamble to this resolution, drafted by John Adams, which advised throwing off oaths of allegiance and suppressing the authority of the Crown in any colonial government that still derived its authority from the Crown. That same day, the Virginia Convention instructed its delegation in Philadelphia to propose a resolution that called for a declaration of independence, the formation of foreign alliances, and a confederation of the states. The resolution of independence was delayed for several weeks, as advocates of independence consolidated support in their home governments.

On June 7, 1776, Richard Henry Lee offered a resolution before the Congress, declaring the colonies independent. He also urged Congress to resolve "to take the most effectual measures for forming foreign Alliances" and to prepare a plan of confederation for the newly independent states. Lee argued that independence was the only way to ensure a foreign alliance since no European monarchs would deal with America if they remained Britain's colonies. American leaders had rejected the divine right of kings in the New World, but recognized the necessity of proving their credibility in the Old World.

Congress formally adopted the resolution of independence, but only after creating three overlapping committees to draft the Declaration, a Model Treaty, and the Articles of Confederation. The Declaration announced the states' entry into the international system; the model treaty was designed to establish amity and commerce with other states, and the Articles of Confederation established "a firm league" among the thirteen free and independent states. These three things together constituted an international agreement to set up central institutions for conducting vital domestic and foreign affairs. Congress finally approved the resolution of independence on July 2, 1776. They next turned their attention to a formal explanation of this decision, the United States Declaration of Independence which was approved on July 4 and published soon thereafter.

Provisional government
The Congress moved to Baltimore in the winter of 1776–77 to avoid capture by British forces who were advancing on Philadelphia. Henry Fite's tavern was the largest building in Baltimore Town at the time and provided a comfortable location of sufficient size for Congress to meet. Its site at the western edge of town was beyond easy reach of the British Royal Navy's ships should they try to sail up the harbor and the Patapsco River to shell the town. Congress was again forced to flee Philadelphia at the end of September 1777, as British troops occupied the city; they moved to York, Pennsylvania, and continued their work.

Congress passed the Articles of Confederation on November 15, 1777, after more than a year of debate, and sent it to the states for ratification. Approval by all 13 states was required for the establishment of the constitution. Jefferson's proposal for a Senate to represent the states and a House to represent the people was rejected, but a similar proposal was adopted later in the United States Constitution. One issue of debate was large states wanting a larger say, nullified by small states who feared tyranny. The small states won and each state had one vote. Another revolved around the issue of western land claims; states without such claims wanted those with claims to yield them to Congress. As written, western land claims remained in the hands of the individual states. Congress urged the states to give their assent quickly, and most did. The first to ratify was Virginia on December 16, 1777; 12 states had ratified the Articles by February 1779, 14 months into the process. The lone holdout, Maryland, finally ratified the Articles on February 2, 1781, doing so only after Virginia relinquished its claims on land north of the Ohio River to Congress.

List of sessions

See also
 American Revolutionary War#Prelude to revolution
 History of the United States (1776–1789)
 List of delegates to the Continental Congress
 State cessions
 Timeline of the American Revolution
 United Colonies
 Founding Fathers of the United States
 Memorial to the 56 Signers of the Declaration of Independence

References

Further reading
 
 Baack, Ben. "Forging a nation state: the Continental Congress and the financing of the War of American Independence." Economic History Review (2001) 54#4 pp: 639-656. online

 Davis, Derek H. Religion and the Continental Congress, 1774-1789: Contributions to Original Intent (Oxford University Press, 2000).

 
 Horgan, Lucille E. Forged in War: The Continental Congress and the Origin of Military Supply and Acquisition Policy (Greenwood, 2002).

 Irvin, Benjamin H. Clothed in Robes of Sovereignty: The Continental Congress and the People Out of Doors (Oxford University Press, 2011). 
 
 
 

 Wilson, Rick K., and Calvin Jillson. "Leadership Patterns in the Continental Congress: 1774-1789." Legislative Studies Quarterly (1989): 5-37. online

Primary sources 
 Burnett, Edmund Cody, ed. Letters of members of the Continental Congress (8 vol. Carnegie institution of Washington, 1921-1936) . online; also online edition
 Library of Congress, ed. Journals of the Continental Congress [=mediatype%3A%22texts%22 online]; also see table of contents

 
 Smith, Paul H., et al. eds. Letters of Delegates to Congress, 1774-1789 (24 volumes, (Washington, Library of Congress, 1978)

External links
 
  Full text of Journals of the Continental Congress, 1774–1789Letters of Delegates to Congress, 1774–1789

1775 establishments in the Thirteen Colonies
1781 disestablishments in the United States

Continental, second
History of Philadelphia
History of Baltimore
History of Lancaster, Pennsylvania
York, Pennsylvania
Provisional governments
United States Declaration of Independence